Christian Flebbe (born 22 March 1960) is a Venezuelan sailor. He competed in the Star event at the 1984 Summer Olympics.

References

External links
 

1960 births
Living people
Venezuelan male sailors (sport)
Olympic sailors of Venezuela
Sailors at the 1984 Summer Olympics – Star
Place of birth missing (living people)